The Women's 20 km Race Walk event at the 2007 World Championships in Athletics took place on August 31, 2007 in the streets of Osaka, Japan.


Medallists

Abbreviations
All times shown are in hours:minutes:seconds

Records

Intermediates

Final ranking

References
Full results - IAAF.org
Event report - IAAF.org
Die Leichtathletik-Statistik-Seite

20 kilometres walk
Racewalking at the World Athletics Championships
2007 in women's athletics